Miloš Veselý (born May 6, 1972 in Liberec) is a Czech bobsledder who has competed since 1997. Competing in two Winter Olympics, he earned his best finish of 16th in the four-man event at Vancouver in 2010.

Vesleý's best finish at the FIBT World Championships was 11th in the four-man event at Calgary in 2005. His best World Cup finish was ninth in the four-man event at St. Moritz in 2005.

References
 
 

1972 births
Bobsledders at the 2006 Winter Olympics
Bobsledders at the 2010 Winter Olympics
Czech male bobsledders
Living people
Olympic bobsledders of the Czech Republic
Sportspeople from Liberec